Stobrawa is a cultivar of Polish potato (also known as 'Mila' and 'Glada') used for food and vodka distilling. It has high levels of starch.

References

Potato cultivars